The Spanish Open is a defunct WTA Tour affiliated women's tennis tournament played from 1972 to 1995. It was held at the Real Club de Tenis Barcelona in Barcelona in Catalonia, Spain and played on outdoor clay courts. It was a Tier V event from 1988 to 1989, a Tier IV event in 1990, a Tier III event from 1991 to 1992 and a Tier II event from 1993 to 1995.

In the 1970s the event was known as the Spanish Championships before becoming an Open in the 1980s and 1990s. It was replaced on the WTA Tour by the Madrid Open in 1996.

Results

Singles

Doubles

References
 WTA Results Archive

 
Clay court tennis tournaments
Defunct tennis tournaments in Spain
Recurring events disestablished in 1995
Recurring sporting events established in 1972
Spanish Open
WTA Tour